The 2015 Hungaroring GP3 Series round was a GP3 Series motor race held on 24 and 26 July 2015 at the Hungaroring in Mogyoród, Pest, Hungary. It was the fourth round of the 2015 GP3 Series. The race weekend supported the 2015 Hungarian Grand Prix.

Classification

Qualifying

Feature Race

Sprint Race

See also 
 2015 Hungarian Grand Prix
 2015 Hungaroring GP2 Series round

References

External links 
 Official website of GP3 Series

Hungaroring
GP3
2015 in Formula Three